The Hippodrome Theater was located at 720 Euclid Ave in Cleveland, Ohio. In its day, it was a very lavish theater and ranked as one of the world's greatest playhouses. Performers appearing at the Hipprodome included Enrico Caruso, Sarah Bernhardt, W. C. Fields, Will Rogers, Al Jolson, and John McCormack. The auditorium had two balconies and seating for 3,548. 

The stage of the Hippodrome could handle large productions and measured 130' wide, 104' deep, 110' high.  It also included a water tank for water spectacles.

The Hippodrome was demolished in 1981 to make way for a parking lot.

Theatres in Cleveland
Theatres completed in 1907
Buildings and structures demolished in 1981
Demolished theatres in the United States
Demolished buildings and structures in Ohio
1981 disestablishments in Ohio
1907 establishments in Ohio